Qaleh Ganj County is in Kerman province, Iran. The capital of the county is the city of Qaleh Ganj. At the 2006 census, the county's population was 69,008 in 14,649 households. The following census in 2011 counted 76,376 people in 18,577 households. At the 2016 census, the county's population was 76,495 in 20,521 households.

Administrative divisions

The population history of Qaleh Ganj County's administrative divisions over three consecutive censuses is shown in the following table. The latest census shows two districts, five rural districts, and one city.

References

 

Counties of Kerman Province